Viktor Emil Frankl (26 March 1905 – 2 September 1997)
was a Jewish-Austrian psychiatrist who founded logotherapy, a school of psychotherapy that describes a search for a life's meaning as the central human motivational force. Logotherapy is part of existential and humanistic psychology theories.

Logotherapy was promoted as the third school of Viennese Psychotherapy, after those established by Sigmund Freud, and Alfred Adler.

Frankl published 39 books. He was a Holocaust survivor.The autobiographical Man's Search for Meaning, a best-selling book, is based on his experiences in various Nazi concentration camps.

Early life
Frankl was born the middle of three children to Gabriel Frankl, a civil servant in the Ministry of Social Service, and Elsa (née Lion), a Jewish family. His interest in psychology and the role of meaning developed when he began taking night classes on applied psychology while in junior high school. As a teenager, he began corresponding with Sigmund Freud, when he asked for permission to publish one of his papers. After graduation from high school in 1923, he studied medicine at the University of Vienna. During his studies, he specialized in neurology and psychiatry, with a focus on depression and suicide.

In 1924, Frankl's first scientific paper was published in The International Journal of Psychoanalysis. Frankl's father was a socialist who named him after Viktor Adler, the founder of the party. During this time, Frankl began questioning the Freudian approach to psychoanalysis. He joined Alfred Adler's circle of students and published his second scientific paper, "Psychotherapy and Worldview", in Adler's International Journal of Individual Psychology in 1925. Frankl was expelled from Adler's circle when he insisted that meaning was the central motivational force in human beings. From 1926, he began refining his theory, which he termed logotherapy.

Career

Psychiatry
Between 1928 and 1930, while still a medical student, he organized youth counselling centers to address the high number of teen suicides occurring around the time of end of the year report cards. The program was sponsored by the city of Vienna and free of charge to the students. Frankl recruited other psychologists for the center, including Charlotte Bühler, Erwin Wexberg, and Rudolf Dreikurs. In 1931, not a single Viennese student died by suicide.

After earning his M.D. in 1930, Frankl gained extensive experience at Steinhof Psychiatric Hospital, where he was responsible for the treatment of suicidal women. In 1937, he began a private practice, but the Nazi annexation of Austria in 1938 limited his opportunity to treat patients. In 1940, he joined Rothschild Hospital, the only hospital in Vienna still admitting Jews, as head of the neurology department. Prior to his deportation to the concentration camps, he helped numerous patients avoid the Nazi euthanasia program that targeted the mentally disabled.

In 1942, just nine months after his marriage, Frankl and his family were sent to the Theresienstadt concentration camp. His father died there of starvation and pneumonia. In 1944, Frankl and the surviving members of his family were transported to Auschwitz, where his mother and brother were murdered in the gas chambers. His wife died later of typhus in Bergen-Belsen. Frankl spent three years in four concentration camps.

Following the war, he became head of the neurology department of the Vienna Polyclinic Hospital, and established a private practice in his home. He worked with patients until his retirement in 1970.

In 1948, Frankl earned a PhD in philosophy from the University of Vienna. His dissertation, The Unconscious God, examines the relationship between psychology and religion, and advocates for the use of the Socratic dialogue (self-discovery discourse) for clients to get in touch with their spiritual unconscious.

In 1955, Frankl was awarded a professorship of neurology and psychiatry at the University of Vienna, and, as visiting professor, lectured at Harvard University (1961), Southern Methodist University, Dallas (1966), and Duquesne University, Pittsburgh (1972).

Throughout his career, Frankl argued that the reductionist tendencies of early psychotherapeutic approaches dehumanised the patient, and advocated for a rehumanisation of psychotherapy.

The American Psychiatric Association awarded Frankl the 1985 Oskar Pfister Award for his contributions to religion and psychiatry.

Man's Search for Meaning
While head of the Neurological Department at the general Polyclinic Hospital, Frankl wrote Man’s Search for Meaning over a nine-day period. The book, originally titled A Psychologist Experiences the Concentration Camp, was released in German in 1946. The English translation of Man's Search for Meaning was published in 1959, and became an international bestseller. Frankl saw this success as a symptom of the "mass neurosis of modern times" since the title promised to deal with the question of life's meaningfulness. Millions of copies were sold in dozens of languages. In a 1991 survey conducted for the Library of Congress and the Book of the Month Club, Man's Search for Meaning was named one of the ten most influential books in the US.

Logotherapy and existential analysis
Frankl developed logotherapy and existential analysis, which are based on philosophical and psychological concepts, particularly the desire to find a meaning in life and free will. Frankl identified three main ways of realizing meaning in life: by making a difference in the world, by having particular experiences, or by adopting particular attitudes.

The primary techniques offered by logotherapy and existential analysis are:
 Paradoxical intention: clients learn to overcome obsessions or anxieties by self-distancing and humorous exaggeration.
 Dereflection: drawing the client's attention away from their symptoms, as hyper-reflection can lead to inaction.
 Socratic dialogue and attitude modification: asking questions designed to help a client find and pursue self-defined meaning in life.

His acknowledgement of meaning as a central motivational force and factor in mental health is his lasting contribution to the field of psychology. It provided the foundational principles for the emerging field of positive psychology.  Frankl's work has also been endorsed in the Chabad philosophy of Hasidic Judaism

Controversy

"Auschwitz survivor" testimony 
In The Missing Pieces of the Puzzle: A Reflection on the Odd Career of Viktor Frankl, Professor of history, Timothy Pytell of California State University, San Bernardino, conveys the numerous discrepancies and omissions in Frankl's "Auschwitz survivor" account and later autobiography, which many of his contemporaries, such as Thomas Szasz, similarly have raised.  In Frankl's Man's Search for Meaning the book devotes approximately half of its contents to describing Auschwitz and the psychology of its prisoners, suggesting a long stay at the death camp, however his wording is contradictory and to Pytell, "profoundly deceptive", when rather the impression of staying for months, Frankl was held close to the train, in the "depot prisoner" area of Auschwitz and for no more than a few days, he was neither registered there, nor assigned a number before being sent on to a subsidiary work camp of Dachau, known as Kaufering III, that together with Terezín, is the true setting of much of what is described in his book.

Origins and implications of logotherapy 

Frankl's doctrine was that one must instill meaning in the events in one's life, and that work and suffering can lead to finding meaning, with this ultimately what would lead to fulfillment and happiness. In 1982 the scholar and holocaust analyst Lawrence L. Langer, who while also critical of what he called Frankl's distortions on the true experience of those at Auschwitz, and Frankl's amoral focus on "meaning", that in Langer's assessment could just as equally be applied to Nazis "finding meaning in making the world free from Jews", would go on to write "if this [logotherapy] doctrine had been more succinctly worded, the Nazis might have substituted it for the cruel mockery of Arbeit Macht Frei"["work sets free", read by those entering Auschwitz]. With, in professor Pytell's view, Langer also penetrating through Frankl's disturbed subtext that Holocaust "survival [was] a matter of mental health. With Langer criticizing Frankl's tone as almost self-congratulatory and promotional throughout, that "it comes as no surprise to the reader, as he closes the volume, that the real hero of Man's Search for Meaning is not man, but Viktor Frankl" by the continuation of the same fantasy of world-view meaning-making, which is precisely what had perturbed civilization into the holocaust-genocide of this era and others.

Pytell later would remark on the particularly sharp insight of Langer's reading of Frankl's holocaust testimony, stating that with Langer's criticism published in 1982 before Pytell's biography, the former had thus drawn the controversial parallels, or accommodations in ideology without the knowledge that Victor Frankl was an advocate/"embraced" the key ideas of the Nazi psychotherapy movement ("will and responsibility") as a form of therapy in the late 1930s. When at that time Frankl would submit a paper and contributed to the Göring institute in Vienna 1937 and again in early 1938 connecting the logotherapy focus on "world-view" to the "work of some of the leading Nazi psychotherapists", both at a time before Austria was annexed by Nazi Germany in 1938. Frankl's founding logotherapy paper, was submitted to and published in the  the journal of the Goering Institute, a psychotherapy movement, with the "proclaimed agenda of building psychotherapy that affirmed a Nazi-oriented worldview".

The origins of logotherapy, as described by Frankl, were therefore a major issue of continuity that Biographer Pytell argues were potentially problematic for Frankl because he had laid out the main elements of logotherapy while working for/contributing to the Nazi-affiliated Göring Institute. Principally Frankl's 1937 paper, that was published by the institute. This association, as a source of controversy, that logotherapy was palatable to Nazism is the reason Pytell suggests, Frankl took two different stances on how the concentration-camp experience affected the course of his psychotherapy theory. Namely, that within the original English edition of Frankl's most well known book, Man's Search for Meaning, the suggestion is made and still largely held that logotherapy was itself derived from his camp experience, with the claim as it appears in the original edition, that this form of psychotherapy was "not concocted in the philosopher's armchair nor at the analyst's couch; it took shape in the hard school of air-raid shelters and bomb craters; in concentration camps and prisoner of war camps." Frankl's statements however to this effect would be deleted from later editions, though in the 1963 edition, a similar statement again appeared on the back of the book jacket of Man's Search for Meaning.

Frankl over the years would with these widely read statements and others, switch between the idea that logotherapy took shape in the camps to the claim that the camps merely were a testing ground of his already preconceived theories. An uncovering of the matter would occur in 1977 with Frankl revealing on this controversy, though compounding another, stating "People think I came out of Auschwitz with a brand-new psychotherapy. This is not the case."

Jewish relations and experiments on the resistance 
In the post war years, Frankl's attitude towards not pursuing justice nor assigning collective guilt to the Austrian people for collaborating with or acquiescing in the face of Nazism, led to "frayed" relationships between Frankl, many Viennese and the larger American Jewish community, such that in 1978 when attempting to give a lecture at the institute of Adult Jewish Studies in New York, Frankl was confronted with an outburst of boos from the audience and was called a "nazi pig".

In 1988 Frankl would further "stir up sentiment against him" by being photographed next to and in accepting the Great Silver Medal with Star for Services to the Republic of Austria as a Holocaust survivor, from President Waldheim, a controversial president of Austria who concurrent with the medal ceremony, was gripped by revelations that he had lied about his WWII military record and was under investigation for complicity in Nazi War crimes. Frankl's acceptance of the medal was viewed by a large segment of the international Jewish community as a betrayal and by a disparate group of commentators, that its timing was politically motivated, an attempt to rehabilitate Waldheim's reputation on the world stage. In his "Gutachten" Gestapo profile, Frankl is described as "politically perfect" by the Nazi secret police, with Frankl's membership in the Austro-fascist "Fatherland Front" in 1934, similarly stated in isolation. It has been suggested that as a state employee in a hospital he was likely automatically signed up to the party regardless of whether he wanted to or not. Frankl was interviewed twice by the secret police during the war, yet nothing of the expected contents, the subject of discussion or any further information on these interviews, is contained in Frankl's file, suggesting to biographers that Frankl's file was "cleansed" sometime after the war.

None of Frankl's obituaries mention the unqualified and unskilled brain lobotomy and trepanation medical experiments approved by the Nazis that Frankl performed on Jews who had committed suicide with an overdose of sedatives, in resistance to their impending arrest, imprisonment and enforced labour in the concentration camp system. The goal of these experiments were to try and revive those who had killed themselves, Frankl justified this by saying that he was trying to find ways to save the lives of Jews. Operating without any training as a surgeon, Frankl would voluntarily request of the Nazis to perform the experiments on those who had killed themselves, and once approved - published some of the details on his experiments, the methods of insertion of his chosen amphetamine drugs into the brains of these individuals, resulting in, at times, an alleged partial resuscitation, mainly in 1942 (prior to his own internment at Theresienstadt ghetto in September, later in that year). Historian Günter Bischof of Harvard University, suggests Frankl's approaching and requesting to perform lobotomy experiments could be seen as a way to "ingratiate" himself amongst the Nazis, as the latter were not, at that time, appreciative of the international scrutiny that these suicides were beginning to create, nor "suicide" being listed on arrest records.

Decorations and awards
 1956: Promotion Award for Public Education of the Ministry of Education, Austria
 1962: Cardinal Innitzer Prize, Austria
 1969: Austrian Cross of Honour for Science and Art, 1st class
 1976: Prize of the Danubia Foundation
 1980: Honorary Ring of Vienna, Austria
 1981: Austrian Decoration for Science and Art
 1985: Oskar Pfister Award, US
 1986: Honorary doctorate from the University of Vienna, Austria
 1986: Honorary member of the association Bürgervereinigung Landsberg im 20. Jahrhundert
 1988: Great Silver Medal with Star for Services to the Republic of Austria
 1995: Hans Prinzhorn Medal
 1995: Honorary Citizen of the City of Vienna
 1995: Great Gold Medal with Star for Services to the Republic of Austria

Personal life
In 1941, Frankl married Tilly Grosser, who was a station nurse at Rothschild Hospital. Soon after they were married, she became pregnant, but they were forced to abort the child. Tilly died in the Bergen Belsen concentration camp.

Frankl's father, Gabriel, originally from Pohořelice, Moravia, died in the Theresienstadt Ghetto concentration camp on 13 February 1943, aged 81, from starvation and pneumonia. His mother and brother, Walter, were both killed in Auschwitz. His sister, Stella, escaped to Australia.

In 1947, Frankl married Eleonore "Elly" Katharina Schwindt. She was a practicing Catholic. The couple respected each other's religious backgrounds, both attending church and synagogue, and celebrating Christmas and Hanukkah. They had one daughter, Gabriele, who went on to become a child psychologist.  Although it was not known for 50 years, his wife and son-in-law reported after his death that he prayed every day and had memorized the words of daily Jewish prayers and psalms.

Frankl died of heart failure in Vienna on 2 September 1997. He is buried in the Jewish section of the Vienna Central Cemetery.

Bibliography
His books in English are:
 Man's Search for Meaning. An Introduction to Logotherapy, Beacon Press, Boston, 2006.  (English translation 1959.  Originally published in 1946 as Ein Psychologe erlebt das Konzentrationslager, "A Psychologist Experiences the Concentration Camp")
 The Doctor and the Soul, (originally titled Ärztliche Seelsorge), Random House, 1955.
 On the Theory and Therapy of Mental Disorders. An Introduction to Logotherapy and Existential Analysis, Translated by James M. DuBois. Brunner-Routledge, London & New York, 2004. 
 Psychotherapy and Existentialism. Selected Papers on Logotherapy, Simon & Schuster, New York, 1967. 
 The Will to Meaning. Foundations and Applications of Logotherapy, New American Library, New York, 1988 
 The Unheard Cry for Meaning. Psychotherapy and Humanism, Simon & Schuster, New York, 2011 
 Viktor Frankl Recollections: An Autobiography.; Basic Books, Cambridge, MA 2000. .
 Man's Search for Ultimate Meaning. (A revised and extended edition of The Unconscious God; with a foreword by Swanee Hunt). Perseus Book Publishing, New York, 1997; . Paperback edition: Perseus Book Group; New York, 2000; 
 Yes to Life: In Spite of Everything Beacon Press, Boston, 2020.

See also

 List of logotherapy institutes, many named after Frankl
 Meaning-making

References

External links

 Viktor Frankl Institute Vienna
 Viktor Frankl Institute of America
 Who Was Viktor Frankl? by Dr. Henry Abramson

1905 births
1997 deaths
People from Leopoldstadt
Academic staff of the University of Vienna
Austrian Jews
Austrian neurologists
Austrian psychiatrists
Auschwitz concentration camp survivors
Dachau concentration camp survivors
Theresienstadt Ghetto survivors
Jewish existentialists
Jewish physicians
Jewish psychiatrists
Jewish scientists
Jewish philosophers
Jewish Austrian writers
Burials at the Vienna Central Cemetery
Knights Commander of the Order of Merit of the Federal Republic of Germany
Recipients of the Austrian Decoration for Science and Art
Recipients of the Grand Decoration with Star for Services to the Republic of Austria
Existential therapists
Logotherapy
20th-century Austrian physicians
Scientists from Vienna